Air Time is an album by the improvisational collective Air featuring Henry Threadgill, Steve McCall, and Fred Hopkins performing three of Threadgill's compositions and one each by Hopkins and McCall.

Reception
The Penguin Guide to Jazz selected this album as part of its suggested Core Collection, stating: "Listening in detail to its five tracks ...helps illuminate much of the group's language, its vivid exploitation of splintered tempi, deliberately awkward and raucous phrasing, devices from other musical traditions ...and most particularly the use of percussion as another voiced and pitched instrument".

In his Allmusic review, Scott Yanow comments: "The trio Air aimed to have close interplay between three musical equals. This Nessa release (their first recording for an American label) has plenty of explorative solos". The Rolling Stone Jazz Record Guide said: "Air Time is probably the best single album indication of the band's range".

Track listing
All compositions by Henry Threadgill except as indicated
 "I'll Be Right Here Waiting..." (Steve McCall) – 2:29
 "No. 2" – 11:46
 "G.v.E." (Fred Hopkins) – 6:59
 "Subtraction" – 13:20
 "Keep Right on Playing Thru the Mirror Over the Water" – 9:04
 Recorded at Streeterville Studios, Chicago, IL on November 17 (tracks 2 & 3) & November 18 (tracks 1, 4 & 5), 1977

Personnel
Henry Threadgill – alto saxophone, tenor saxophone, flute, bass flute, hubkaphone
Fred Hopkins – bass
Steve McCall – drums, percussion

References

1978 albums
Air (free jazz trio) albums
Nessa Records albums